Karim (also known as Mian Kanan, also Romanized as Mīān Kanān) is a village in Kashkan Rural District, Shahivand District, Dowreh County, Lorestan Province, Iran. At the 2006 census, its population was 270, in 57 families.

References 

Towns and villages in Dowreh County